Buccinum lyperum is a species of sea snail, a marine gastropod mollusk in the family Buccinidae, the true whelks. A few authors use the epithet "lyperium"

Description
The size of an adult shell varies between 51 mm and 75 mm.

Distribution
This species is found in the North Pacific Ocean along the Bering Sea and Kamchatka.

References

 Baily J.L. 1961. A new name for Buccinum tenue, Gray, 1839 preoccupied.  Veliger, 3 (4): 93–94.
 Kosuge S. 1972.  Illustrations of type specimens of molluscs described by William Healey Dall; Tokyo, 65 p.
 D. O. Alexeyev, A. V. Gornichnykh , New gastropod species Buccinum  frausseni  sp. nov. (Gastropoda, Buccinidae), with comments on intraspecific structure of Buccinum scalariforme  Beck in Møller, 1842; Ruthenica,  2009, vol. 19, No. 1: 1-18

External links
 Gastropods.com : Buccinum tenue tenue; accessed : 19 June 2011

Buccinidae
Taxa named by William Healey Dall
Gastropods described in 1919